The Mediterranean Acacia–Argania dry woodlands and succulent thickets is a Mediterranean forests, woodlands, and scrub ecoregion in North Africa centered mainly on Morocco but also including northwestern Western Sahara and the eastern Canary Islands.

Geography
This ecoregion occupies  in Morocco, northwestern Western Sahara, and the eastern Canary Islands (Lanzarote, Fuerteventura, and associated islets). On the African mainland, it encompasses the Atlantic coastal plain, the lowlands of Al Haouz Province, the valleys of the Sous River and Draa River, and the westernmost part of the High Atlas and Anti-Atlas Mountains. 

The winters are mild and frost-free and the summers relatively cool because of the moderating influence of the ocean. Temperatures average .

The Mediterranean Acacia-Argania dry woodlands and succulent thickets ecoregion is bounded on the north by the Mediterranean woodlands and forests, on the east by the North Saharan steppe and woodlands, on the south by the Atlantic coastal desert, and on the west by the Atlantic Ocean.

Flora
The chief plant communities in the ecoregion are dominated by Argania spinosa accompanied by Acacias, and the predominant lower vegetation is succulent shrubland dominated by Euphorbias. Some of the associated plant species are Periploca laevigata, Senecio anthephorbium, Launaea arborescens, Warionia saharae, Acacia gummifera, Rhus trpartitum, Withania frutescens, Euphorbia officinarum, Cytisus albidus, Ephedra altissima and Tetraclinis articulata.

There are a number of plants endemic to the Canary Islands portion of the ecoregion.

Fauna
Mammals found on the mainland portion of the ecoregion include the honey badger, European wildcat, Egyptian mongoose, Barbary ground squirrel, North African elephant shrew, Hoogstraal's gerbil, Barbary striped grass mouse and wild boar. Other, rarer mammals include caracal, African wildcat, dorcas gazelle, Cuvier's gazelle and Barbary sheep. The Canarian shrew (Crocidura canariensis) is endemic to Fuerteventura, Lanzarote, and neighboring islets.

Protected areas
A 2017 assessment found that 17,725 km², or 18%, of the ecoregion is in protected areas.
Protected areas in Morocco include Arganeraie Biosphere Reserve (23690 km², Souss-Massa National Park), Khenifiss National Park (1668.16 km²), Oued Chbeyka Hunting Reserve (1329.78 km²), and Rouisset Tayssa Boulafraij Ouinskour et Oued Daraa Hunting Reserve (3177.54 km²).

Protected areas in the eastern Canary Islands include Timanfaya National Park (51.81 km²), Chinijo Archipelago Natural Park (460.16 km²), and Los Volcanes Natural Park (99.95 km²) on Lanzarote, and Jandia Natural Park (149.83 km²) and Corralejo Natural Park (26.89 km²) on Fuerteventura.

External links

References

Ecoregions of Africa
Ecoregions of Morocco
Ecoregions of Spain
Ecoregions of Western Sahara
Environment of the Canary Islands
Ecoregions of the Mediterranean Basin
Macaronesia
Maghreb
Mediterranean forests, woodlands, and scrub
Palearctic ecoregions
Sclerophyll forests